Jean Guillaume Bruguière (19 July 1749 – 3 October 1798) was a French physician, zoologist and diplomat.

Biography 
Bruguière was born in Montpellier on 19 July 1749. He was a doctor, connected to the University of Montpellier. He was interested in invertebrates, mostly snails (gastropods).

He accompanied the explorer Kerguelen-Trémarec on his first voyage to the Antarctic in 1773. In 1790 he accompanied the entomologist Olivier on an expedition to Persia, but his poor health didn't allow him to continue. In 1792, although he was ill, he visited the Greek archipelago and the Middle East, together with the entomologist Guillaume-Antoine Olivier. He was asked by the French Directoire to try to set up a Franco-Persian alliance, but was unsuccessful, lacking the training of a diplomat. He died on the voyage back.

He described several taxa in his book Tableau Encyclopédique et Méthodique des trois Règnes de la Nature: vers, coquilles, mollusques et polypes divers which appeared in three volumes in 1827, long after he had died. He also wrote Histoire Naturelle des Vers. Vol. 1 (1792) but he had to stop at the letter "C". Christian Hee Hwass continued his work and wrote most of it.

He died in Ancona in October 1798 (and not in 1799, as mentioned in some sources; there was a discrepancy due to the French revolutionary calendar).

He was mainly interested in molluscs and other invertebrates, as can be seen in the following list of the taxa he named.

Authority 
He named more than 140 marine genera or species, among them :
Genera
Anodontites  Bruguière, 1792 (mollusc)
Cerithium  Bruguière, 1789 (mollusc)
Cerithium subg. Cerithium Bruguière, 1789 (mollusc)
Corbula Bruguière, 1792 (mollusc)
Lima Bruguière, 1797 (mollusc)
Lingula Bruguière, 1791 (brachiopod)
Lucina Bruguière, 1797 (mollusc)
Oliva Bruguière, 1789 (mollusc)
Orthoceras Bruguière, 1789 (mollusc)
Ovula Bruguière, 1789 (mollusc)
Terebra Bruguière, 1789 (mollusc)

Species 
Acanthopleura spinosa (Bruguière, 1792) (mollusc)
Anadara ovalis Bruguière, 1789 (mollusc)
Anodontites crispata Bruguière, 1792 (mollusc)
Arca imbricata Bruguière, 1789 (mollusc)
Balanus crenatus Bruguière (crustacean)
Balanus perforatus Bruguière (crustacean)
Batillaria zonalis Bruguière, 1792 (mollusc)
Beroe ovata Bruguière, 1789 (Ctenophora)
Bulla striata Bruguière, 1789 (mollusc)
Bullia miran Bruguière, 1789 (mollusc)
Cardita ajar Bruguière, 1792 (mollusc)
Cardium ringens Bruguière, 1789 (mollusc)
Cassidula aurisfelis Bruguière, 1789 (mollusc)
Cerithium eburneum  Bruguière, 1792 (mollusc)
Cerithium vulgatum Bruguière (mollusc)
Chaetopleura spinosa Bruguière, 1792 (mollusc)
Concholepas concholepas Bruguière, 1792 (mollusc)
Chondrina avenacea Bruguière, 1792 (mollusc)
Conus arenatus Hwass in Bruguière, 1792 (mollusc)
Conus catus Hwass in Bruguière, 1792 (mollusc)
Conus gubernator Hwass in Bruguière, 1792 (mollusc)
Conus pulcher siamensis Hwass in Bruguière, 1792 (mollusc)
Diplodon granosus Bruguière, 1792 (mollusc)
Gourmya vulgata Bruguière, 1789 (mollusc)
Lingula anatina Lamarck, 1801 (brachiopod)
Micromelo undata  Bruguière, 1792 (mollusc)
Partula otaheitana Bruguière, 1792 (mollusc)
Perrona nifat Bruguière, 1792 (mollusc)
Placenta placuna Bruguière, 1792 (mollusc)
Retusa truncatula Bruguière, 1792 (mollusc)
Scapharca inaequivalvis  Bruguière (mollusc)
Serripes groenlandicus Bruguière, 1789 (mollusc)
Solatopupa similis Bruguière, 1792 (mollusc)
Sphyradium doliolum Bruguière, 1792 (mollusc)
Subulina octona Bruguière, 1792 (mollusc)
Terebralia sulcata Bruguière, 1792 (mollusc)

The genus Bruguiera (mangrove trees from the family Rhizophoraceae) was named by Jean-Baptiste Lamarck in his honor. Bruguière Peak in Antarctica is named after Jean Guillaume Bruguière.

See also
 European and American voyages of scientific exploration

References

Lamy, E., 1930. Les conchyliologistes Bruguière et Hwass. Journ. de Conchyl. Vol. 74.
The Taxonomicon

1749 births
1798 deaths
French zoologists
French malacologists
Conchologists
French expatriates in Iran